Thai Express is a chain of restaurants serving Thai cuisine. It opened its first restaurant at Holland Village in Singapore in May 2002. Since then, there have been other outlets in Malaysia, China and Vietnam.

History
The idea of a restaurant was conceived in 2000 by Grace Goh and Ivan Lee who were classmates at the National University of Singapore. They decided to serve Thai food due to its popularity in Singapore. The first Thai Express restaurant opened in Holland Village in May 2002.

Lee would become the company's CEO while Goh returned to University to study law. 

In May 2008 the company was sold to Minor International.

Type of restaurant
A restaurant review characterize Thai Express as breaking "away from the traditional Thai style of communal dining by serving items in individual portions for those who may want to dine alone." "In place of fine dining, which may be intimidating to some, Thai Express is all about being fresh, contemporary and fuss-free." The typical casual and modern decor of the restaurant is glass partitions with wooden chairs of
Scandinavian style design.

Menu
95% of dishes are cooked to order.

Several dishes on the menu have been created by native Thai chef Suwakhon Wangsai, who has 25 years of international cooking experience.

Japanese-inspired Popiah Wrap, the Tofu-Mushroom Salad and Tofu Squares.are two dishes that have been reported to be unique Thai fried squid, Thai Mee Sua (Thai Longevity Noodle), Curried Soft Shell Crab are also dishes on the menu. Thai Express is one of the few Thai restaurants in Singapore to serve Thai laksa, of which they serve eight varieties.

Locations
The original location is in Holland Village, Singapore.  There are many other locations in Singapore including, but not limited to, a restaurant in The Esplanade - Theatres on the Bay. The Paragon Shopping Centre, and Plaza Singapura. Thai Express restaurants can be found in China, Vietnam, Malaysia, Singapore and Thailand.

See also
 List of Thai restaurants

References

External links
 Official website

Restaurants established in 2002
Thai restaurants
2002 establishments in Singapore
Restaurant chains in Singapore
Minor International
Singaporean brands